Golf Resort Tycoon is a business simulation computer game developed by Cat Daddy Games and published by Activision in 2001.

Gameplay
The game is based on the premise of players constructing their own golf resorts with a limited amount of funds hoping to earn more income through the satisfaction of the resort's attendees.
There are two gameplay modes: Instant Action and Challenges. Instant Action allows a player to freely create their own golf resort. Challenges requires a player to complete specific series of tasks.

Reception
Most of the reviews for Golf Resort Tycoon stated that it was a mediocre game overall. GameSpot gave it a 6.2, stating "Golf Resort Tycoon can be a nice diversion and a decent way to kill time in short spurts, but it's definitely not for everyone. GameZone rated the game 8 of 10 saying it is challenging and addictive.

Sequels
A sequel to Golf Resort Tycoon, Golf Resort Tycoon II was released in 2002.

External links

References 

Business simulation games
Windows games
Windows-only games
2001 video games
Cat Daddy Games games
Activision games
Single-player video games
Video games developed in the United States